Charana Daasi is a 1956 Indian Telugu-language drama film written by Vempati Sadasivabrahmam and directed by T. Prakash Rao. It stars N. T. Rama Rao, Akkineni Nageswara Rao, Anjali Devi and Savitri, with music composed by S. Rajeswara Rao. The film is based on Rabindranath Tagore's 1906 Bengali novel Noukadubi. It was simultaneously made in Tamil as Mathar Kula Manikkam (1956). Story and Dialogues were by Vempati Sadasivabrahmam

Plot 
The film revolves around two couples – Dr. Chandra Sekhar & Parvathi ahead Venu & Lakshmi. Venu & Lakshmi love birds, but Venu is forcibly knitted with a girl Devaki by his parents. Simultaneously, another wedding takes place in the same village, of an orthodox girl Parvathi which is disrupted due to dowry problems. During that plight, Dr. Chandra Shekar the bestie of Parvathi's brother nuptials her to keep them at save face. Due to the sudden espousal, the couple fails to notice. Parallelly, as it is an unwilling alliance Venu too overlooks the bride. Both the bridal parties travel on the same train, which runs into a disastrous accident. In which, Venu's parents and wife die. Here, Venu mistakes Parvathi as his wife sees her bridal dress and takes her home. Meanwhile, Shekar assumes that both his friend and wife are deceased. Fortuitously, on time, Venu realizes the truth which he hides from Parvathi and engages himself in the relentless task of searching for Parvathi's husband to unite them. Before he could succeed, Lakshmi misconstrues him by considering Parvathi as his wife. Right now, Parvathi also learns the truth and fled from Venu's house with mortifying when she tries to commit suicide. Through the wheel of fortune, she is rescued by her mother-in-law Annapurna and lands at her husband's house. Nevertheless, knowing the reality she is disabled to divulge her identity being dastarded that Shekar may suspect her chastity. Besides, Lakshmi becomes a lunatic due to Venu's deceit and she is admitted to Shekar's hospital. During the time of treatment, Lakshmi & Shekar convene with each other, and their elders decide to merge them which Parvathi also happily approves. Just in time, Venu arrives and imparts the facts when Shekar whole-heartedly accepts Parvathi and both of them thank Venu even though Lakshmi feels sorry. Finally, the movie ends on a happy note with the marriage of Venu & Lakshmi.

Cast 
N. T. Rama Rao as Dr. Chandra Sekhar
Akkineni Nageswara Rao as Venu
Anjali Devi as Parvathi
Savitri as Lakshmi
S. V. Ranga Rao as Raghavaiah
Relangi as Mahesham
Ramana Reddy as Narsu & Krishna (dual role)
Govindarajula Subba Rao as Basavaiah
Chadalavada as Hanumanthu
Perumallu as Rangaiah
Kannamba as Annapurna
Sowcar Janaki as Saroja
Suryakantam as Seshamma
Hemalatha as Venu's mother
Kamala Lakshman as Vasavadatta in Svapnavasavadattam Dance Drama
Ragini as Dancer
Ambika Sukumaran as Dancer

Production 
The film is based on Rabindranath Tagore's novel, Noukadubi. The director T. Prakash Rao chose to replace the boat crash sequence in the novel with a train accident in the film, inspired by a real event that took place near Ariyalur. The film was shot simultaneously in Telugu and Tamil languages, with the Tamil version titled Mathar Kula Manikkam.

Soundtrack 

Music was composed by S. Rajeswara Rao.

Release 
Charanadasi and Mathar Kula Manikkam, the Telugu and Tamil versions respectively, were released the same year and were box-office successes.

References

External links 

1950s multilingual films
1956 drama films
1956 films
Films based on Indian novels
Films based on works by Rabindranath Tagore
Films directed by T. Prakash Rao
Films scored by S. Rajeswara Rao
Indian black-and-white films
Indian drama films